Alta Banu is a 2018 Bangladeshi romantic drama film directed by Arun Chowdhury and starring Zakia Bari Momo, Anisur Rahman Milon and Farzana Rikta. The screenplay, by Brindaban Das, is based on a story of the same name by Faridur Reza Sagar.

Alta Banu was filmed on the banks of the Kaliganga River in Ghior Upazila starting in July 2017, and later on the banks of the Gomati River in Comilla. It released on 20 April 2018, at five cinema halls in Bangladesh. The film was premiered at Toronto International Film Festival, Pyongyang International Film Festival, Dhaka International Film Festival and Delhi International Film Festival.

Cast
 Zakia Bari Momo as Alta
 Anisur Rahman Milon as Sohel Rana, Alta's fiancé
 Farzana Rikta as Banu, Alta's younger sister
 Raisul Islam Asad as Alta's father
 Dilara Zaman
 Shamima Nazneen
 Mamunur Rashid

Reception

Critical response
Swapan Mullick of The Statesman wrote that the film had "a restrained tone that revealed a distinct effort to reach out to a serious audience". Film director Dipankar Dipon praised Arun Chowdhury's direction & Momo's performance after watching the film.

References

Bengali-language Bangladeshi films
2018 films
2010s Bengali-language films